Gajula may refer to:

 Gajulamandyam
 Gajularega